The 2001 British Formula Three season was the 51st British Formula Three Championship season. It commenced on 1 April, and ended on 29 September after twenty-six races, with Japanese driver Takuma Sato crowned champion.

Drivers and teams
The following teams and drivers were competitors in the 2001 season. The Scholarship class is for older Formula Three cars.  All cars competed on Avon tyres.

Calendar

Standings
Championship's point system was 20–15–12–10–8–6–4–3–2–1 with an extra point for the fastest lap.

Notes

References

External links
 
 
 The official website of the British Formula 3 Championship

British Formula Three Championship seasons
Formula Three season
British
British Formula 3